The  Los Angeles Rams season was the team's 18th year with the National Football League and the tenth season in Los Angeles. The Rams won the Western Conference title and hosted the NFL championship game, but lost to the Cleveland Browns, 38–14.

The Rams did not reach another NFL title game until 24 years later, in Super Bowl XIV in January 1980.

Schedule

Playoffs

Standings

References

Los Angeles Rams
Los Angeles Rams seasons
Los Angeles